

Deserts
Mojave Desert (High Desert)
Sonoran Desert
Colorado Desert (Low Desert)
Yuha Desert
See also: Lower Colorado River Valley Deserts
Great Basin Desert

Valleys

Desert Valleys include the:
Owens Valley
Deep Springs Valley
Eureka Valley
Saline Valley
Death Valley
Panamint Valley
Indian Wells Valley
Fremont Valley
Antelope Valley
Victor Valley
Lucerne Valley
Lanfair Valley
Coachella Valley
Imperial Valley
Lower Colorado River Valley
Death Valley

Natural history
Category: Flora of the California desert regions
Category: Fauna of the Mojave Desert
Category: Fauna of the Colorado Desert
Category: Flora of the Sonoran Deserts
Wildflower superbloom

Parks, Nature Preserves, and Wilderness Areas
The deserts contain many national, state, county, municipal, and conservation foundation managed parks, recreation and scenic areas, wildlife preserves and nature reserves, and wilderness areas.

Parks
Mojave National Preserve (National Park Service)
Death Valley National Park
Joshua Tree National Park
Santa Rosa and San Jacinto Mountains National Monument
Anza-Borrego Desert State Park
Mount San Jacinto State Park
Red Rock Canyon State Park
 Mojave Narrows Park

Recreation areas
Algodones Dunes - Imperial Sand Dunes Recreation Area
Sonny Bono Salton Sea National Wildlife Refuge

Unique features and landmarks

Devils Punchbowl County Park, Littlerock, California
Trona Pinnacles National Natural Landmark
Mitchell Caverns National Preserve
Mecca Hills National Preserve
Saddleback Butte State Park. Lake Los Angeles, California
Antelope Valley California Poppy Reserve
Rainbow Basin National Natural Landmark, Barstow, California
Amboy Crater National Natural Landmark, Amboy, California
Cima volcanic field

Wildlife and nature preserves
Big Morongo Canyon Preserve
Imperial National Wildlife Refuge
Cibola National Wildlife Refuge
Arthur B. Ripley Desert Woodland State Park

History and Art Museums
Palm Springs Desert Museum,  Palm Springs, California
Moorten Botanical Garden and Cactarium, Palm Springs, California
Kelso Depot, Restaurant and Employees Hotel
Harvey House Railroad Depot Casa del Desierto, Barstow, California
Western America Railroad Museum, Barstow, California
El Garces Hotel, Needles, California
Maturango Museum, Ridgecrest, California
Mojave Desert Heritage & Cultural Center, old Goffs schoolhouse and depot, Goffs, California
California Route 66 Museum, Victorville, California
Antelope Valley Indian Museum State Historic Park, Palmdale, California
Eastern California Museum, Owens Valley, Independence, California
Cabot's Pueblo Museum, Desert Hot Springs, California

Population centers

Native American Reservations
Agua Caliente Band of Cahuilla Indians, Palm Springs, California
Colorado River Indian Reservation
Morongo Band of Cahuilla Mission Indians
Ewiiaapaayp Band of Kumeyaay Indians
Los Coyotes Band of Cahuilla and Cupeno Indians
Torres-Martinez Desert Cahuilla Indians
Augustine Band of Cahuilla Indians
Fort Yuma Indian Reservation
Paiute-Shoshone Indians of the Lone Pine Community of the Lone Pine Reservation
Timbisha Indian Village, Furnace Creek, California

Cities and Settlements

Adelanto
Amboy
Apple Valley
Baker
Barstow
Big Bear Lake
Blythe
Brawley
Boron
Borrego Springs
Calexico
California City
Calipatria
Cantil
China Lake
Coachella,
Daggett
Darwin
Deep Springs
Desert Center
Desert Hot Springs
El Centro
Essex
Fort Irwin
Furnace Creek
Heber
Hinkley
Holtville
Homewood Canyon-Valley Wells
Imperial, Indian Wells
Indio
Inyokern
Johannesburg
Joshua Tree
Keeler
Kelso
La Quinta
Lancaster
Landers
Lone Pine
Mojave
Montclair
Morongo Valley
Needles
Newberry Springs
Niland
Ocotillo
Olancha
Palmdale
Palm Desert
Palm Springs
Pearsonville,
Rancho Mirage
Randsburg
Ridgecrest
Rosamond
Salton City
Seeley
Shoshone
Tecopa
Trona
Twentynine Palms
Victorville
Westmorland
Yermo
Yucca Valley

Military reservations
Edwards Air Force Base
China Lake Naval Weapons Center
Fort Irwin Military Reservation
Twentynine Palms Marine Corps Base
Chocolate Mountain Aerial Gunnery Range

Other sights

 Blythe Intaglios
 Bradshaw Trail
 Calico Ghost Town
 Coso Rock Art District petroglyphs
 Mojave Road
 Pioneertown
 U.S. Route 66
 Trona Pinnacles
 Wildflower superbloom
 Zzyzx

Desert topics
California